Thomas Edward Rendle VC (14 December 1884 – 1 June 1946) was an English recipient of the Victoria Cross, the highest and most prestigious award for gallantry in the face of the enemy that can be awarded to British and Commonwealth forces.

Details
He was 29 years old, and a bandsman in the 1st Battalion, The Duke of Cornwall's Light Infantry, British Army during the First World War when the following deed took place for which he was awarded the VC.

On 20 November 1914 near Wulverghem, Belgium, Bandsman Rendle attended to the wounded under very heavy rifle and shell fire and rescued men from the trenches in which they had been buried from the blowing in of the parapets by the fire of the enemy's heavy howitzers.

Later life
Rendle later achieved the rank of sergeant.

Rendle was a Freemason and was initiated into Needles Lodge No. 2838 on the Isle of Wight on 2 August 1916.

After World War I, he emigrated to South Africa where he became bandmaster of the Duke of Edinburgh's Own Rifles.

The medal
His Victoria Cross is displayed at the Duke of Cornwall's Light Infantry Museum in Victoria Barracks, Bodmin, Cornwall.

References

Monuments to Courage (David Harvey, 1999)
The Register of the Victoria Cross (This England, 1997)
VCs of the First World War - 1914 (Gerald Gliddon, 1994)

External links
 

1884 births
1946 deaths
Military personnel from Bristol
British World War I recipients of the Victoria Cross
Duke of Cornwall's Light Infantry soldiers
British Army personnel of World War I
English emigrants to South Africa
British Army recipients of the Victoria Cross
British military musicians
South African Army personnel
Freemasons of the United Grand Lodge of England